Jennifer Elise Cox is an American actress known for her satirical portrayal of Jan Brady in The Brady Bunch Movie and A Very Brady Sequel.

Life and career
Cox was born in New York City, where she played in two operas, Don Giovanni and Madam Butterfly.

After graduating from a performing arts high school Cox moved to Los Angeles with her mother, Kate. She attended the California Institute of the Arts and earned a Bachelor of Fine Arts degree in acting. While getting into acting, Cox scooped ice cream at Ben & Jerry's, and made money by playing cards when she was struggling.

She married director/producer Lee Bronstein, and starred in his 2013 film Out West.

Jan Brady
In 1995, Cox won over the role she became widely known for middle-child Jan Brady in the film The Brady Bunch Movie, a pastiche role she originated off-Broadway in The Real Live Brady Bunch. Speaking of the cast, "We instantly bonded", said Cox. "We instantly thought of each other as family, as The Brady Bunch."

The film opened at #1 at the box office with $14,827,066 and grossed $46,576,136, in the U.S. and Canada and $7,500,000 overseas making a total gross of $54,076,136 worldwide. Although the film received a mixed reception, Cox's performance was praised. Patrick Phillips from Pop Culture Tonight called her performance "excellent, yet underrated".

While a reviewer from The Motion Pictures stated "Cox pulls off all of [The] nuttiness perfectly. She is without a doubt the best part of the movie." A week after The Brady Bunch Movie's opening she had a guest spot on The George Wendt Show. The same year she reprised her role as Jan Brady for the TV series Wings, and portrayed Shannon, a student at the women's studies program, on the TV series Murphy Brown.

In 1996, she costarred alongside Michael Gross and Hilary Swank in the horror film Sometimes They Come Back... Again, reprised her role of Jan Brady in the Brady Bunch sequel A Very Brady Sequel, and guest starred on an episode of The Parent 'Hood.

In 1998, she had a recurring role as social outcast Felice on the sitcom Clueless, and reprised her role of Jan Brady on the TV series Moesha. That year she also had small bits in the films Fear and Loathing in Las Vegas and Can't Hardly Wait.

Later career
In 1999, she signed on to star alongside Jean Smart in Tiara Tango, later retitled Forever Fabulous. The film went through a troubled history while being made, as actresses Cathy Moriarty and Suzanne Pleshette both had parts before quitting due to massive rewrites of the script. The film struggled with money and due to budget constraints, an entire scene had to be eliminated and rewritten. Cox stated she didn't even receive a salary for recording the film's voice-over narration. The film premiered at the 1999 Austin Film Festival. Cox had a small role in the film EdTV.

In 2000, she guest starred on an episode of Sex and the City, and on an episode of Will & Grace. It took several takes just for Will & Grace star Debra Messing to get past the first line of Cox's character, Nurse Pitman. Messing would later tell US Weekly this was because she couldn't "look at her without seeing Jan Brady."

Cox then became a main cast member on Hype, an American sketch comedy television series on The WB,

However, due to low ratings the show was canceled. The next year it was announced Cox would reunite with The Brady Bunch Movie co-star and friend Alanna Ubach, in Life After Donna Dell. Described as a dark, campy, 1950s musical, it was written by Ubach herself. However, the film was later scrapped.

In 2005, she appeared on three episodes of Six Feet Under, two episodes of Twins, and one episode of The Comeback.

In August 2006, she began playing the recurring role of receptionist Tiffany Riley Clarke on Lovespring International. However, the show was cancelled months later. Soon after, she was cast as Amy Anderson, a recurring role on the improvised American comedy series 10 Items or Less. She would go on to play the character till 2009, when this show was cancelled.

In 2009, she made five appearances on the Lifetime original sitcom Rita Rocks. She was in talks to play the character more for the next season, however Lifetime canceled the series. The next year she played a small role in the film The Back-Up Plan.

In 2011, she had roles on multiple films, Balls to the Wall, Poolboy: Drowning Out the Fury, Eating Out: The Open Weekend, A Holiday Engagement and Spooky Buddies. She also had a recurring role on Pretty the Series, and she joined the cast of Web Therapy as the recurring role of Gina Spinks. She would play Gina until August 11, 2015, when Showtime cancelled the series after four seasons.

In 2013, she made three guest appearances as Gina on Web Therapy, the Web series on which Web Therapy is based.

Filmography

Film

Television

References

External links

American film actresses
American stage actresses
American television actresses
Living people
Actresses from New York City
20th-century American actresses
21st-century American actresses
American sketch comedians
Comedians from New York City
20th-century American comedians
21st-century American comedians
Year of birth missing (living people)